The 2003 Big Ten Conference football season was the 108th season for the Big Ten Conference. Michigan won the conference, finishing ahead of Ohio State and Purdue.

Rankings

Bowl games

See also
 2003 All-Big Ten Conference football team

References